EuCorVac-19 is a COVID-19 vaccine candidate developed by EuBiologics Co.

Clinical trials

Phase I/II 
EuBiologics Co., Ltd started the study on February 23, 2021. The study is called "Safety, Tolerance and Immunogenicity of EuCorVac-19 for the Prevention of COVID-19 in Healthy Adults" As of April 26, 2021, the trial is ongoing and participants are being accepted. It has an expected primary completion date of March 2022. The study is expected to be completed in January 2023.

Phase III 
EuBiologics registered a phase III trial with a starting date of October 1, 2022 in the Philippines.

References 

Clinical trials
South Korean COVID-19 vaccines
Science and technology in South Korea
Protein subunit vaccines